Oh Ddog-Yi (Hangul: 오똑이, born June 1, 1984 in South Korea) is a retired South Korean professional footballer who played for different clubs in South Korea, Russia, Bangladesh, Singapore, India.

Career
Prior to joining Super Reds FC in 2008 he played for Ulsan Hyundai Mipo Dockyard in the Korea National League and FC Sibir Novosibirsk in the Russian First Division. He joined Brunei DPMM FC in 2009 but left a few months later to join Balestier Khalsa.

References

1984 births
Living people
South Korean footballers
South Korean expatriate footballers
FC Sibir Novosibirsk players
Mohammedan SC (Dhaka) players
Balestier Khalsa FC players
Korea National League players
Singapore Premier League players
Expatriate footballers in Russia
South Korean expatriate sportspeople in Russia
Expatriate footballers in Singapore
South Korean expatriate sportspeople in Singapore
Expatriate footballers in Bangladesh
South Korean expatriate sportspeople in Bangladesh
Expatriate footballers in Brunei
South Korean expatriate sportspeople in Brunei
DPMM FC players
Bangladesh Football Premier League players
Association football forwards